This is a list of 646 species in Clivina, a genus of ground beetles in the family Carabidae.

Clivina species

Subgenus Antroforceps Barr, 1967
 Clivina alabama Bousquet, 2012
 Clivina bolivari (Barr, 1967)
 Clivina sasajii Ball, 2001
Subgenus Clivina Latreille, 1802
 Clivina acutimentum Balkenohl, 2021
 Clivina acutipalpis Putzeys, 1877
 Clivina addita Darlington, 1934
 Clivina adstricta Putzeys, 1867
 Clivina aequalis Blackburn, 1890
 Clivina agona Putzeys, 1867
 Clivina agumbea Balkenohl, 2021
 Clivina alleni Baehr, 2015
 Clivina alternans Darlington, 1971
 Clivina amazonica Putzeys, 1861
 Clivina ambigua Baehr, 2015
 Clivina ampandrandavae Basilewsky, 1973
 Clivina angulicollis Baehr, 2015
 Clivina angustipes Putzeys, 1868
 Clivina antennaria Putzeys, 1867
 Clivina anthracina Klug, 1862
 Clivina antoni Balkenohl, 2018
 Clivina apexopaca Balkenohl, 2021
 Clivina apexplana Balkenohl, 2021
 Clivina argenteicola Baehr, 2015
 Clivina armata Putzeys, 1846
 Clivina arnhemensis Baehr, 2015
 Clivina arunachalensis Saha & Biswas, 1985
 Clivina asymmetrica Baehr, 2015
 Clivina athertonensis Baehr, 2015
 Clivina atrata Putzeys, 1861
 Clivina atridorsis Sloane, 1905
 Clivina australasiae Boheman, 1858
 Clivina australica Sloane, 1896
 Clivina bacillaria Bates, 1889
 Clivina balli Baehr, 2015
 Clivina baloghi Baehr, 2015
 Clivina bankae Baehr, 2017
 Clivina banksi Sloane, 1907
 Clivina basalis Chaudoir, 1843
 Clivina bataviae Baehr, 2015
 Clivina batesi Putzeys, 1867
 Clivina bengalensis Putzeys, 1846
 Clivina bicolor Putzeys, 1867
 Clivina bicolorata Baehr, 2015
 Clivina bicornuta Baehr, 2008
 Clivina bidentata Putzeys, 1846
 Clivina bifoveata Putzeys, 1861
 Clivina bifoveifrons Baehr, 2015
 Clivina biguttata Putzeys, 1867
 Clivina bilyi Baehr, 2015
 Clivina bingbong Baehr, 2015
 Clivina biplagiata Putzeys, 1866
 Clivina birdumensis Baehr, 2015
 Clivina biroi Kult, 1951
 Clivina bitincta Sloane, 1905
 Clivina bituberculata Putzeys, 1867
 Clivina blackburni Sloane, 1896
 Clivina boliviensis Putzeys, 1846
 Clivina boops Blackburn, 1890
 Clivina bouchardi Baehr, 2015
 Clivina bovillae Blackburn, 1890
 Clivina bowenensis Baehr, 2008
 Clivina brandti Darlington, 1962
 Clivina breviceps Baehr, 2015
 Clivina brevicollis Putzeys, 1867
 Clivina brevicornis Darlington, 1962
 Clivina brevior Putzeys, 1867
 Clivina brevipennis Baehr, 2015
 Clivina brevisterna Sloane, 1916
 Clivina breviuscula Putzeys, 1867
 Clivina brittoni Baehr, 2015
 Clivina brooksi Baehr, 2015
 Clivina brunnea Putzeys, 1846
 Clivina brunnicolor Sloane, 1916
 Clivina brunnipennis Putzeys, 1846
 Clivina bulirschi Baehr, 2015
 Clivina bullata Andrewes, 1927
 Clivina bunburyana Baehr, 2015
 Clivina burmeisteri Putzeys, 1867
 Clivina cairnsensis Baehr, 2015
 Clivina carbinensis Baehr, 2015
 Clivina carbonaria Putzeys, 1867
 Clivina carinifera Baehr, 2015
 Clivina carnabyi Baehr, 2017
 Clivina carpentaria Sloane, 1896
 Clivina castanea Westwood, 1837
 Clivina cava Putzeys, 1866
 Clivina choatei Bousquet & Skelley, 2012
 Clivina clarencea Baehr, 2015
 Clivina clivinoides (Schmidt-Goebel, 1846)
 Clivina cobourgiana Baehr, 2017
 Clivina cochlearia Baehr, 2015
 Clivina collaris (Herbst, 1784)
 Clivina columbica Putzeys, 1846
 Clivina communis Baehr, 2015
 Clivina confinis Baehr, 2015
 Clivina conicollis Baehr, 2017
 Clivina consanguinea Baehr, 2015
 Clivina consimilis Baehr, 2015
 Clivina convexior Baehr, 2015
 Clivina cooindae Baehr, 2017
 Clivina cooperensis Baehr, 2015
 Clivina coriacea Baehr, 2015
 Clivina coronata Putzeys, 1873
 Clivina corrugata Baehr, 2015
 Clivina coryzoides Baehr, 1989
 Clivina crassidentata Baehr, 2008
 Clivina crassipennis Baehr, 2017
 Clivina crawfordensis Baehr, 2015
 Clivina crenulata Balkenohl, 2021
 Clivina cribricollis Putzeys, 1861
 Clivina cribrifrons Sloane, 1905
 Clivina cribrosa Putzeys, 1868
 Clivina cruciata Putzeys, 1867
 Clivina cruralis Putzeys, 1867
 Clivina csikii Kult, 1951
 Clivina cubae Darlington, 1934
 Clivina cuttacutta Baehr, 2015
 Clivina cylindracea Baehr, 2008
 Clivina cylindriformis Sloane, 1896
 Clivina cylindripennis Sloane, 1905
 Clivina dampieri Sloane, 1916
 Clivina darlingtoni Baehr, 2008
 Clivina darlingtoniana Baehr, 2015
 Clivina darwinensis Baehr, 2015
 Clivina darwini Sloane, 1916
 Clivina dealata Darlington, 1962
 Clivina debilis Blackburn, 1890
 Clivina defaverii Baehr, 2008
 Clivina deleta Darlington, 1962
 Clivina delkeskampi Kult, 1959
 Clivina demarzi Baehr, 1988
 Clivina densepunctata Baehr, 2015
 Clivina densesulcata Baehr, 2008
 Clivina denticollis Sloane, 1896
 Clivina dentifemorata Putzeys, 1846
 Clivina deplanata Putzeys, 1867
 Clivina depressa Kult, 1951
 Clivina depressicollis Baehr, 1989
 Clivina desperata Baehr, 2008
 Clivina difformis Putzeys, 1868
 Clivina diluta Darlington, 1953
 Clivina dilutipes Putzeys, 1868
 Clivina dimidiata Putzeys, 1866
 Clivina dingo Sloane, 1905
 Clivina discrepans Baehr, 2015
 Clivina dissimilis Putzeys, 1846
 Clivina distigma Putzeys, 1867
 Clivina doddi Sloane, 1905
 Clivina dolens Putzeys, 1873
 Clivina dostali Baehr, 2015
 Clivina douglasensis Baehr, 2015
 Clivina drumonti Balkenohl, 2021
 Clivina drysdalea Baehr, 2015
 Clivina dubia Baehr, 2017
 Clivina duboisi Burgeon, 1935
 Clivina edithae Baehr, 2015
 Clivina edungalbae Baehr, 2015
 Clivina elegans Putzeys, 1861
 Clivina elliott Baehr, 2015
 Clivina elongata Chaudoir, 1843
 Clivina elongatula Nietner, 1856
 Clivina emarginata Putzeys, 1868
 Clivina eremicola Blackburn, 1894
 Clivina erugata Darlington, 1962
 Clivina erugatella Darlington, 1962
 Clivina erythropus Putzeys, 1846
 Clivina euphratica Putzeys, 1867
 Clivina excavatifrons Baehr, 2015
 Clivina exilis Sloane, 1916
 Clivina extensicollis Putzeys, 1846
 Clivina ferruginea Putzeys, 1868
 Clivina fessa Darlington, 1962
 Clivina finitima Baehr, 2015
 Clivina flava Putzeys, 1868
 Clivina fluviatilis Baehr, 2015
 Clivina fontisaliceae Baehr, 2008
 Clivina fortis Sloane, 1896
 Clivina fossifrons Putzeys, 1867
 Clivina fossor (Linnaeus, 1758)
 Clivina fossulata Baehr, 2015
 Clivina foveiceps Putzeys, 1846
 Clivina foveifrons Baehr, 2017
 Clivina foveiventris Baehr, 2015
 Clivina frenchi Sloane, 1896
 Clivina froggatti Sloane, 1896
 Clivina frontalis Baehr, 2015
 Clivina fuscicornis Putzeys, 1846
 Clivina fuscipes Putzeys, 1846
 Clivina gamma Andrewes, 1929
 Clivina gemina Baehr, 2017
 Clivina gentilis Baehr, 2015
 Clivina germanni Balkenohl, 2021
 Clivina gerstmeieri Baehr, 1989
 Clivina gilesi Baehr, 2008
 Clivina glabrata Baehr, 2015
 Clivina glabriceps Baehr, 2015
 Clivina glabripennis Baehr, 2017
 Clivina goldingi Baehr, 2017
 Clivina goniostoma Putzeys, 1867
 Clivina gracilipes Sloane, 1896
 Clivina grahami Baehr, 2015
 Clivina grandiceps Sloane, 1896
 Clivina grata Darlington, 1953
 Clivina gressitti Darlington, 1962
 Clivina grossi Baehr, 2008
 Clivina gubarae Baehr, 2015
 Clivina guineensis Kult, 1951
 Clivina gunlomensis Baehr, 2015
 Clivina hackeri Sloane, 1907
 Clivina haeckeli Baehr, 2015
 Clivina hanichi Baehr, 2008
 Clivina hartleyi Baehr, 2015
 Clivina hasenpuschi Baehr, 2015
 Clivina heathlandica Baehr, 2015
 Clivina helferi Putzeys, 1867
 Clivina helmsi Blackburn, 1892
 Clivina helmutbergeri Baehr, 2015
 Clivina hennigi Baehr, 2015
 Clivina heridgei Baehr, 2008
 Clivina heros Baehr, 2017
 Clivina heterogena Putzeys, 1866
 Clivina hilaris Putzeys, 1861
 Clivina hogani Balkenohl, 2021
 Clivina hogenhoutae Baehr, 2015
 Clivina horaki Baehr, 2017
 Clivina horneri Baehr, 2017
 Clivina houstoni Baehr, 2008
 Clivina hovorkai Baehr, 2015
 Clivina howdenorum Baehr, 2015
 Clivina impressefrons LeConte, 1844
 Clivina impressiceps Baehr, 2015
 Clivina impuncticollis Baehr, 2015
 Clivina inaequalifrons Baehr, 1989
 Clivina inaequalis Putzeys, 1867
 Clivina incerta Baehr, 2008
 Clivina incurvicollis Baehr, 2017
 Clivina inermis Baehr, 2015
 Clivina infans Baehr, 2017
 Clivina inopaca Darlington, 1962
 Clivina inopinata Baehr, 2017
 Clivina inops Baehr, 2008
 Clivina integra Andrewes, 1929
 Clivina interioris Baehr, 2008
 Clivina interposita Baehr, 2017
 Clivina intersecta Baehr, 1989
 Clivina isogona Putzeys, 1868
 Clivina jabiruensis Baehr, 2015
 Clivina jakli Baehr, 2015
 Clivina janae Kult, 1959
 Clivina janetae Baehr, 2015
 Clivina javanica Putzeys, 1846
 Clivina jodasi Kult, 1959
 Clivina kakaduana Baehr, 2015
 Clivina kalumburu Baehr, 2015
 Clivina kapuri Kult, 1951
 Clivina karikali Jedlicka, 1964
 Clivina kaszabi Kult, 1951
 Clivina kershawi Sloane, 1916
 Clivina kimberleyana Baehr, 2015
 Clivina komareki Kult, 1951
 Clivina kubor Darlington, 1971
 Clivina kulti Darlington, 1962
 Clivina kununurrae Baehr, 2015
 Clivina laeta Putzeys, 1867
 Clivina laetipes Putzeys, 1867
 Clivina laevicollis Baehr, 2015
 Clivina laevigata Baehr, 2017
 Clivina lamondi Baehr, 2015
 Clivina langeri Baehr, 2015
 Clivina languida Baehr, 2015
 Clivina larrimah Baehr, 2015
 Clivina lata Putzeys, 1867
 Clivina latesulcata Baehr, 2015
 Clivina laticeps Putzeys, 1846
 Clivina latimanus Putzeys, 1846
 Clivina latiuscula Putzeys, 1867
 Clivina leai Sloane, 1896
 Clivina lebasii Putzeys, 1846
 Clivina lepida Putzeys, 1866
 Clivina leptosoma Andrewes, 1938
 Clivina lewisi Andrewes, 1927
 Clivina limbipennis Jacquelin du Val, 1857
 Clivina lincolnensis Baehr, 2008
 Clivina lobata Bonelli, 1813
 Clivina lobifera Baehr, 2015
 Clivina lobipes Sloane, 1896
 Clivina longipennis Putzeys, 1861
 Clivina longissima Baehr, 2015
 Clivina longithorax Baehr, 2008
 Clivina lucernicola Baehr, 2015
 Clivina lucida Putzeys, 1867
 Clivina lutea Baehr, 2015
 Clivina macleayi Sloane, 1896
 Clivina macularis Putzeys, 1867
 Clivina madiganensis Baehr, 2015
 Clivina magnicollis Baehr, 2008
 Clivina mahoni Baehr, 2017
 Clivina major Sloane, 1917
 Clivina mareebae Baehr, 2015
 Clivina marginata (Putzeys, 1868)
 Clivina marginicollis Putzeys, 1867
 Clivina marlgu Baehr, 2015
 Clivina mastersi Sloane, 1896
 Clivina matarankae Baehr, 2015
 Clivina matthewsi Baehr, 2015
 Clivina mcquillani Baehr, 2015
 Clivina media Putzeys, 1846
 Clivina megalops Baehr, 2015
 Clivina mekongensis Lesne, 1896
 Clivina micans Baehr, 2017
 Clivina mickoleiti Baehr, 2015
 Clivina microps Baehr, 2015
 Clivina minilyae Baehr, 2015
 Clivina minuta Baehr, 2015
 Clivina minutissima Baehr, 2015
 Clivina mirrei Kult, 1959
 Clivina misella Sloane, 1905
 Clivina mjoebergi Baehr, 2008
 Clivina mocquerysi Alluaud, 1935
 Clivina moerens Putzeys, 1873
 Clivina molucca Balkenohl, 2021
 Clivina monilicornis Sloane, 1896
 Clivina monteithi Baehr, 2015
 Clivina monticola Andrewes, 1931
 Clivina montisbelli Baehr, 2017
 Clivina montisferrei Baehr, 2015
 Clivina moreheadensis Baehr, 2015
 Clivina moretona Baehr, 2017
 Clivina morosa Baehr, 2008
 Clivina muirellae Baehr, 2015
 Clivina multispinosa Baehr, 2015
 Clivina murgenellae Baehr, 2015
 Clivina mustela Andrewes, 1923
 Clivina myops Bousquet, 1997
 Clivina nadineae Baehr, 2015
 Clivina nana Sloane, 1896
 Clivina napieria Baehr, 2015
 Clivina netolitzkyi Kult, 1951
 Clivina newcastleana Baehr, 2017
 Clivina nicholsona Baehr, 2015
 Clivina nigra Sloane, 1905
 Clivina nigrosuturata Baehr, 2015
 Clivina nitescens Baehr, 2017
 Clivina nitidula Putzeys, 1867
 Clivina normanbyensis Baehr, 2017
 Clivina normandi Kult, 1959
 Clivina normantona Baehr, 2015
 Clivina nourlangie Baehr, 2015
 Clivina nyctosyloides Putzeys, 1868
 Clivina obliquata Putzeys, 1867
 Clivina obliquicollis Sloane, 1905
 Clivina oblita Putzeys, 1867
 Clivina oblonga (Putzeys, 1873)
 Clivina obscuripennis Putzeys, 1867
 Clivina obscuripes Blackburn, 1890
 Clivina obsoleta Sloane, 1896
 Clivina occulta Sloane, 1896
 Clivina odontomera Putzeys, 1868
 Clivina okutanii Habu, 1958
 Clivina olliffi Sloane, 1896
 Clivina oodnadattae Blackburn, 1894
 Clivina orbitalis Baehr, 2008
 Clivina oregona Fall, 1922
 Clivina ovalior Baehr, 2017
 Clivina ovalipennis Sloane, 1905
 Clivina pachysoma Baehr, 2017
 Clivina pallida Say, 1823
 Clivina pallidiceps Sloane, 1905
 Clivina pampicola Putzeys, 1867
 Clivina pandana Andrewes, 1938
 Clivina paradebilis Baehr, 2008
 Clivina parallela Lesne, 1896
 Clivina parolliffi Baehr, 2015
 Clivina parryensis Baehr, 2015
 Clivina parryi Putzeys, 1861
 Clivina parvidens Putzeys, 1867
 Clivina parvula Putzeys, 1867
 Clivina paucidentata Baehr, 2015
 Clivina pectonada Sloane, 1905
 Clivina pectoralis Putzeys, 1868
 Clivina peninsulae Baehr, 2015
 Clivina pentecostensis Baehr, 2015
 Clivina perlonga Baehr, 2015
 Clivina pernigra Baehr, 2015
 Clivina perthensis Baehr, 1989
 Clivina pfisteri Andrewes, 1930
 Clivina picina Andrewes, 1936
 Clivina pilbarae Baehr, 2015
 Clivina pileolata Bates, 1892
 Clivina planiceps Putzeys, 1861
 Clivina planicollis LeConte, 1857
 Clivina planifrons Sloane, 1907
 Clivina planulata Putzeys, 1867
 Clivina platensis Putzeys, 1867
 Clivina platynota Baehr, 2017
 Clivina pluridentata Putzeys, 1877
 Clivina plurisetofaria Balkenohl, 2021
 Clivina pravei Lutshnik, 1927
 Clivina procera Putzeys, 1866
 Clivina profundestriolata Baehr, 2017
 Clivina pronotalis Baehr, 2015
 Clivina protibialis Baehr, 2008
 Clivina punctaticeps Putzeys, 1868
 Clivina puncticeps Darlington, 1962
 Clivina punctifrons Putzeys, 1867
 Clivina punctigera LeConte, 1857
 Clivina punctiventris Putzeys, 1867
 Clivina punctulata LeConte, 1852
 Clivina putzeysi Csiki, 1927
 Clivina quadrata Putzeys, 1867
 Clivina quadraticollis Baehr, 2015
 Clivina quadratifrons Sloane, 1896
 Clivina quadricornuta Baehr, 2015
 Clivina quadristriata Baehr, 2008
 Clivina queenslandica Sloane, 1896
 Clivina quinquesetosa Baehr, 2015
 Clivina rectipennis Baehr, 2017
 Clivina recurvidens Putzeys, 1867
 Clivina regularis Sloane, 1896
 Clivina reticulata Baehr, 2015
 Clivina riverinae Sloane, 1896
 Clivina robusta Sloane, 1905
 Clivina rokebyensis Baehr, 2015
 Clivina roperensis Baehr, 2015
 Clivina rubicunda LeConte, 1857
 Clivina rubripes Putzeys, 1868
 Clivina rubropicea Baehr, 2015
 Clivina rufipennis Baehr, 2008
 Clivina rufonigra Baehr, 1989
 Clivina rufula Darlington, 1962
 Clivina rugicollis Baehr, 2015
 Clivina rugosepunctata Baehr, 2015
 Clivina rugosifrons Baehr, 2017
 Clivina rugosofemoralis Balkenohl, 1999
 Clivina ryaceki Baehr, 2017
 Clivina sabulosa W.S.MacLeay, 1825
 Clivina sagittifera Baehr, 2015
 Clivina sansapor Darlington, 1962
 Clivina saundersi Andrewes, 1926
 Clivina scabra Baehr, 2015
 Clivina schaubergeri Kult, 1951
 Clivina schillhammeri Balkenohl, 2021
 Clivina sculpticeps Darlington, 1953
 Clivina sectifrons Bates, 1892
 Clivina sellata Putzeys, 1866
 Clivina semicava Baehr, 2015
 Clivina semirubra Baehr, 2017
 Clivina shortlandica Emden, 1937
 Clivina siamica Putzeys, 1867
 Clivina sicula Baudi di Selve, 1864
 Clivina simillima Baehr, 2015
 Clivina simulans Sloane, 1896
 Clivina sinuicola Baehr, 2017
 Clivina sloanei Csiki, 1927
 Clivina sodalis Baehr, 2015
 Clivina soror Baehr, 2008
 Clivina sororcula Baehr, 2015
 Clivina spadix Andrewes, 1929
 Clivina spatulata Baehr, 2015
 Clivina spatulifera Andrewes, 1929
 Clivina spinipes Putzeys, 1867
 Clivina stefaniana G.Müller, 1942
 Clivina sternalis Baehr, 2015
 Clivina storeyi Baehr, 2015
 Clivina stricta Putzeys, 1861
 Clivina stygica Putzeys, 1867
 Clivina subdepressa Kult, 1951
 Clivina subfoveiceps Kult, 1959
 Clivina subfusa Darlington, 1962
 Clivina subrufipes Baehr, 2017
 Clivina sulcaticeps Sloane, 1923
 Clivina sulcicollis Sloane, 1896
 Clivina suturalis Putzeys, 1861
 Clivina svenssoni Basilewsky, 1946
 Clivina synnotensis Baehr, 2015
 Clivina synoikos Baehr, 2015
 Clivina syriaca J.Sahlberg, 1908
 Clivina szekessyi Kult, 1951
 Clivina szitoi Baehr, 2008
 Clivina talpa Andrewes, 1927
 Clivina tanami Baehr, 2015
 Clivina taurina Putzeys, 1867
 Clivina tenuis Baehr, 2015
 Clivina territorialis Baehr, 2008
 Clivina thenmala Balkenohl, 2021
 Clivina thoracica Baehr, 2017
 Clivina toledanoi Baehr, 2015
 Clivina toombae Baehr, 2015
 Clivina torrida Putzeys, 1867
 Clivina toxopei Darlington, 1962
 Clivina tozeria Baehr, 2015
 Clivina trachys Andrewes, 1930
 Clivina transgrediens Baehr, 2015
 Clivina transversa Putzeys, 1867
 Clivina transversicollis Putzeys, 1867
 Clivina trapezicollis Baehr, 2015
 Clivina tribulationis Baehr, 2015
 Clivina tridentata Putzeys, 1867
 Clivina tripuncta Darlington, 1962
 Clivina triseriata Baehr, 2017
 Clivina tristis Putzeys, 1846
 Clivina truncata Putzeys, 1877
 Clivina tuberculata Putzeys, 1846
 Clivina tuberculifrons Blackburn, 1890
 Clivina ubirr Baehr, 2015
 Clivina ulrichi Baehr, 2015
 Clivina uluru Baehr, 2015
 Clivina uncinata Baehr, 2017
 Clivina uptoni Baehr, 2015
 Clivina vagans Putzeys, 1866
 Clivina validior Baehr, 2015
 Clivina variabilis Baehr, 2015
 Clivina variseta Baehr, 2017
 Clivina ventripunctata Baehr, 2015
 Clivina vicina Baehr, 2008
 Clivina victoriae Baehr, 2017
 Clivina vigil Darlington, 1962
 Clivina vittata Sloane, 1896
 Clivina vixsulcata Baehr, 2017
 Clivina vulgivaga Boheman, 1858
 Clivina wachteli Baehr, 2015
 Clivina wallacei Putzeys, 1867
 Clivina weanyanae Baehr, 2015
 Clivina weipae Baehr, 2015
 Clivina weiri Baehr, 2015
 Clivina werrisensis Baehr, 2015
 Clivina westralis Baehr, 2015
 Clivina westwoodi Putzeys, 1867
 Clivina wildi Blackburn, 1890
 Clivina wiluna Darlington, 1953
 Clivina windjanae Baehr, 2017
 Clivina wurargae Baehr, 2008
 Clivina yanoi Kult, 1951
 Clivina ypsilon Dejean, 1830
 Clivina zborowskii Baehr, 2015
Subgenus Cliviniella Kult, 1959
 Clivina albertiana Burgeon, 1935
 Clivina camerunensis Kult, 1959
 Clivina ghesquierei Kult, 1959
 Clivina veselyi Kult, 1959
Subgenus Dacca Putzeys, 1861
 Clivina boreri Balkenohl, 2020
 Clivina forcipata (Putzeys, 1861)
 Clivina ursulae Balkenohl, 2020
Subgenus Eoclivina Kult, 1959
 Clivina attenuata (Herbst, 1806)
 Clivina bhamoensis Bates, 1892
 Clivina burgeoni Kult, 1959
 Clivina dumolinii Putzeys, 1846
 Clivina machadoi Basilewsky, 1955
 Clivina sagittaria Bates, 1892
 Clivina striata Putzeys, 1846
 Clivina sulcigera Putzeys, 1867
Subgenus Leucocara Bousquet, 2009
 Clivina acuducta Haldeman, 1843
 Clivina allaeri Kult, 1959
 Clivina alluaudi Kult, 1947
 Clivina americana Dejean, 1831
 Clivina angolana Kult, 1959
 Clivina antoinei Kult, 1959
 Clivina aucta Erichson, 1843
 Clivina baenningeri Kult, 1951
 Clivina balfourbrownei Kult, 1951
 Clivina bartolozzii Magrini & Bulirsch, 2021
 Clivina basilewskyi Kult, 1959
 Clivina birmanica Kult, 1951
 Clivina caffra Putzeys, 1861
 Clivina californica Van Dyke, 1925
 Clivina capensis Kult, 1959
 Clivina cardiothorax Baehr, 2008
 Clivina championi Kult, 1951
 Clivina clypealis Baehr, 2008
 Clivina collarti Burgeon, 1935
 Clivina consobrina Putzeys, 1867
 Clivina coomani Kult, 1951
 Clivina damarina Péringuey, 1896
 Clivina decellei Basilewsky, 1968
 Clivina dewaillyi Kult, 1959
 Clivina donabaueri Dostal, 2012
 Clivina erythropyga Putzeys, 1867
 Clivina esulcata Baehr, 2008
 Clivina femoralis Putzeys, 1846
 Clivina fratercula Baehr, 2008
 Clivina girardi Kult, 1959
 Clivina heinemanni Kult, 1959
 Clivina hoberlandti Kult, 1951
 Clivina insignis Kult, 1959
 Clivina interstitialis Kolbe, 1883
 Clivina jeanneli Kult, 1959
 Clivina katangana Kult, 1959
 Clivina kawa Basilewsky, 1948
 Clivina kirschenhoferi Dostal, 2012
 Clivina kochi Schatzmayr, 1936
 Clivina lacustris Putzeys, 1867
 Clivina laevifrons Chaudoir, 1842
 Clivina latior Baehr, 2008
 Clivina lebisi Kult, 1959
 Clivina legorskyi Dostal, 2012
 Clivina madagascariensis Putzeys, 1846
 Clivina makolskii Kult, 1959
 Clivina martii Kult, 1959
 Clivina martinbaehri Dostal & Bulirsch, 2016
 Clivina maxima Kult, 1959
 Clivina montei Kult, 1959
 Clivina mordax Putzeys, 1861
 Clivina morio Dejean, 1831
 Clivina muelleri Kult, 1959
 Clivina ngayensis Burgeon, 1935
 Clivina niponensis Bates, 1873
 Clivina obenbergeri Kult, 1951
 Clivina opacidermis Baehr, 1989
 Clivina orientalis Kult, 1959
 Clivina pacholatkoi Dostal & Bulirsch, 2016
 Clivina palmeni Kult, 1959
 Clivina perplexa Péringuey, 1896
 Clivina pfefferi Kult, 1951
 Clivina rufa LeConte, 1857
 Clivina rugiceps Klug, 1832
 Clivina sacra Putzeys, 1875
 Clivina saigonica Kult, 1951
 Clivina sakalava Dostal, 2016
 Clivina schatzmayri Kult, 1959
 Clivina schuhi Dostal, 2016
 Clivina semicarinata Putzeys, 1877
 Clivina simplicifrons Fairmaire, 1901
 Clivina sobrina Dejean, 1831
 Clivina straneoi Kult, 1959
 Clivina subterranea Decou; Nitzu & Juberthie, 1994
 Clivina sudanensis Kult, 1959
 Clivina tanganyikana Kult, 1959
 Clivina tranquebarica Bonelli, 1813
 Clivina tutancamon Schatzmayr, 1936
 Clivina vosahloi Kult, 1959
 Clivina yorkiana Baehr, 2008
 Clivina zebi Kult, 1951
Subgenus Paraclivina Kult, 1947
 Clivina bipustulata (Fabricius, 1798)
 Clivina convexa LeConte, 1844
 Clivina fasciata Putzeys, 1846
 Clivina fassatii Kult, 1947
 Clivina ferrea LeConte, 1857
 Clivina floridae Csiki, 1927
 Clivina marginipennis Putzeys, 1846
 Clivina postica LeConte, 1846
 Clivina stigmula Putzeys, 1846
 Clivina striatopunctata Dejean, 1831
 Clivina sulcipennis Putzeys, 1867
Subgenus Physoclivina Kult, 1959
 Clivina bulirschi Dostal, 2015
 Clivina donabaueriana Dostal, 2015
 Clivina dostaliana Balkenohl, 2018
 Clivina physopleura Burgeon, 1935

References

Clivina